The 1985 European Curling Championships were held from 10 to 14 December at the Sportzentrum arena in Grindelwald, Switzerland.

The West German men's team skipped by Rodger Gustaf Schmidt won their first title and the Swiss women's team skipped by Jaqueline Landolt won their third title.

Men

Teams

First Phase (Triple Knockout)

Round 1
Two teams promoted to Second Phase

Round 2
Three teams promoted to Second Phase

Round 3
Three teams promoted to Second Phase

Second Phase (Double Knockout)

Round 1
Two teams promoted to Playoffs

Round 2
Two teams promoted to Playoffs

Placement Phase

Range 9-14

Range 5-8

Playoffs

Final standings

Women

Teams

First Phase (Triple Knockout)

Round 1
Two teams promoted to Second Phase

Round 2
Three teams promoted to Second Phase

Round 3
Three teams promoted to Second Phase

Second Phase (Double Knockout)

Round 1
Two teams promoted to Playoffs

Round 2
Two teams promoted to Playoffs

Placement Phase

Range 9-14

Range 5-8

Playoffs

Final standings

References

European Curling Championships, 1985
European Curling Championships, 1985
European Curling Championships
International curling competitions hosted by Switzerland
December 1985 sports events in Europe
Sports competitions in Grindelwald